The Rural Municipality of Flett's Springs No. 429 is a rural municipality (RM) in the Canadian province of Saskatchewan within Census Division No. 15 and  Division No. 5.

History 
The RM of Carrot River No. 429 was originally incorporated as a rural municipality on December 13, 1909. Its name was changed to the RM of Flett's Springs No. 429 on February 28, 1938.

Geography

Communities and localities 
The following urban municipalities are surrounded by the RM.

Cities
Melfort

Villages
Beatty

The following unincorporated communities are within the RM.

Localities
Ethelton
Pathlow

Demographics 

Government 
The RM of Flett's Springs No. 429 is governed by an elected municipal council and an appointed administrator that meets on the second Wednesday of every month. The reeve of the RM is Blaine Forsyth while its administrator is Tamie McLean. The RM's office is located in Melfort.

Transportation 
Rail
Lanigan - Naicam  Branch C.P.R—serves Silver Park, Resource, Clemens, Melfort
Humboldt, Melfort, Ridgedale Branch C.N.R—serves Daylesford, St. Brieux, Pathlow, Lipsett, Melfort, Whittome, Brooksby, Ridgedale
Swan River - Prince Albert Branch C.N.R—serves Tisdale, Valparaiso, Star City, Naisberry, Melfort, Beatty, Kinistino, Weldon, Branspeth

Roads
Highway 3—serves Melfort and Beatty
Highway 368—serves Beatty
Highway 6—serves Melfort
Highway 41
Highway 776

See also 
List of rural municipalities in Saskatchewan

References 

Flett's Springs
Flett's Springs No. 429, Saskatchewan
Division No. 15, Saskatchewan